Johanna Frederika "Jo" Schouwenaar-Franssen (3 May 1909 – 24 December 1995) was a Dutch politician of the People's Party for Freedom and Democracy (VVD).

Decorations

References

External links

Official
  Drs. J.F. (Jo) Schouwenaar-Franssen Parlement & Politiek
  Drs. J.F. Schouwenaar-Franssen (VVD) Eerste Kamer der Staten-Generaal

 

1909 births
1995 deaths
Commanders of the Order of the Netherlands Lion
Dutch expatriates in Italy
Dutch nonprofit directors
Dutch lobbyists
Dutch people of World War II
Dutch political activists
Freedom Party (Netherlands) politicians
Grand Officers of the Order of Orange-Nassau
Leiden University alumni
Members of the Senate (Netherlands)
MEPs for the Netherlands 1958–1979
20th-century women MEPs for the Netherlands
Ministers of Social Work of the Netherlands
Ministers of Sport of the Netherlands
Municipal councillors of Rotterdam
People's Party for Freedom and Democracy politicians
People's Party for Freedom and Democracy MEPs
People from De Bilt
Remonstrants
University of Perugia alumni
Women government ministers of the Netherlands
20th-century Dutch educators
20th-century Dutch politicians